Southeast Bybee Boulevard is a light rail station in Portland, Oregon, United States, served by TriMet as part of the MAX Light Rail system. It is the 14th station southbound on the Orange Line, which operates between Portland City Center, Southeast Portland, and Milwaukie. The grade-separated, island platform station adjoins Union Pacific Railroad (UP) freight tracks  to the east and McLoughlin Boulevard to the west. Its entrances are located on the Bybee Bridge, which spans over the platform and connects Portland's Sellwood-Moreland and Eastmoreland neighborhoods. Nearby places of interest include Westmoreland Park, Eastmoreland Golf Course, Crystal Springs Rhododendron Garden, and Reed College.

Southeast Bybee Boulevard station was built as part of the Portland–Milwaukie Light Rail Project, an extension of MAX from downtown Portland to Milwaukie in Clackamas County. The station began construction in July 2013 and opened with the entire Portland–Milwaukie segment on September 12, 2015. A bus stop by the entrance is served by TriMet bus route 19–Woodstock/Glisan.

History

Southeast Bybee Boulevard station is named after the road it serves, which is carried by the Bybee Bridge directly above the station platform. The Bybee Bridge was originally constructed in 1911 by the Ladd Estate Company to serve properties being developed around the then-newly established Reed College in Eastmoreland. The bridge connected the Eastmoreland and Sellwood-Moreland communities by crossing over the Southern Pacific Railroad tracks, which was built by the Oregon Central Railroad in 1869 and acquired by UP in 1996. The original Bybee Bridge included a streetcar line called "Eastmoreland" that spurred from the Sellwood line on Milwaukie Avenue in Sellwood to 32nd and Rex streets in Eastmoreland. Both streetcar lines were operated by the Portland Railway, Light and Power Company. The Eastmoreland line was converted to trolley buses, Portland's first such service, in 1936, and converted again to motor buses after 1956.

In 1979, regional planners proposed a light rail line for the McLoughlin Boulevard corridor against the backdrop of freeway revolts that defeated the Mount Hood Freeway project. The line would have run from downtown Portland all the way south to Oregon City in Clackamas County as part of a network of "transitways" between Portland and its suburbs.

During the environmental phase of the Portland–Milwaukie Light Rail Project, the project steering committee proposed a light rail station below the Bybee Bridge. In 2008, Metro (the Portland metropolitan area's regional government) adopted a locally preferred alternative that retained the stop. Outreach for the station began in early 2009 during the light rail project's preliminary engineering phase. Regional transit agency TriMet engaged with nearby neighborhood associations, namely the Eastmoreland Neighborhood Association and the Sellwood-Moreland Improvement League, to discuss specific design elements and address safety and accessibility concerns. In 2012, TriMet approached engineering firm CH2M Hill for further design recommendations, which led to a second bus pull-out and elevator on the south side of the bridge. Construction of the station commenced in early 2013.

By the end of January 2014, the station was about 60 percent complete. Upon completion, the station was predicted be one of the most visible within inner southeast Portland. It opened on September 12, 2015.

Station details

The station occupies a section of dedicated light rail right-of-way running in between two parallel transportation corridors: McLoughlin Boulevard to the west and UP freight tracks to the east, which mark the boundary of two Portland neighborhoods, Sellwood-Moreland to the west and Eastmoreland to the east. The station is immediately surrounded by Westmoreland Park, Eastmoreland Golf Course, and Crystal Springs Rhododendron Garden. Southeast Bybee Boulevard station features an island platform situated directly beneath the Bybee Bridge, accessed from entrances at the crest of the bridge, with stairs and an elevator on both the north and south sides.

Services

It recorded 513 average weekday boardings in fall 2018. Trains serve the station for approximately 22 hours per day on weekdays, 21½ hours on Saturdays, and 19½ hours on Sundays. Headways measure from 15 minutes during most of the day to 30 minutes in the early mornings and late evenings. Most northbound Orange Line trains through operate into the Yellow Line and continue to Expo Center station in North Portland, Oregon. A bus stop by the station entrance is served by TriMet bus route 19–Woodstock/Glisan, which provides riders access to nearby Reed College.

References

External links

 
 

2015 establishments in Oregon
Eastmoreland, Portland, Oregon
MAX Light Rail stations
MAX Orange Line
Railway stations in Portland, Oregon
Railway stations in the United States opened in 2015
Sellwood-Moreland, Portland, Oregon